C2it was a person-to-person money transfer service established by Citibank in 2000 as a competitor to PayPal and Billpoint. It was formed as a partnership with AOL, and later with Compuserve and Microsoft.

The service was discontinued in November 2003, due to low usage; a 2002 Gartner survey indicated that of various online money transfer methods, only 1 percent said they used C2it vs 33 percent who used PayPal.

References 

Financial services companies established in 2000
Internet properties established in 2000
Online financial services companies of the United States
Payment service providers
Defunct financial services companies of the United States